Neem Phuler Modhu is a 2022 Indian Bengali romantic comedy drama television series that premiered on 14 November 2022 on Zee Bangla. The show is also available on the digital platform ZEE5 before its telecast. The show is produced by Zee Bangla. It stars Pallabi Sharma as Alokparna and Rubel Das as Srijon in lead roles.

Synopsis
Parna grew up in a nuclear family of 4 members and gets married to Srijan who belongs to a joint family. But as she grew up in a small family, after her marriage, she struggles to fit into her new family. The story then follows that how Parna adjusts to her family and how she and her family members change after coming in terms to each other's perspectives. It also revolves around how Parna and Srijan fall in love with other and how they faces different types of hurdles everyday.

Cast

Main
Pallavi Sharma as Alokparna Dutta (née Basu) aka Parna - Priyotosh and Sarbani's daughter, Piklu's elder sister, Srijan's wife
Rubel Das as Srijan Dutta - Amitesh and Krishna's son, Parna's husband, Hemnalini's second grandson, Barsha's brother, Ayan and Chayan's cousin brother,

Recurring
Biswanath Basu as Priyotosh Basu- Sarbani's husband, Parna and Piklu's father
Sanjuktaa Roy Chowdhury as Sarbani Basu- Priyotosh's wife, Parna and Piklu's mother
Rishav Chakraborty as Piklu Basu- Sarbani and Priyotosh's son, Parna's younger brother
Lily Chakravarty as Hemnalini Dutta- Head of Dutta family, Animesh,Amitesh and Akhilesh's mother, Krishna and Lalita's mother-in-law, Ayan, Chayan, Srijon and Barsha's grandmother, Porna and Moumita's grandmother-in-law
Soumi Chakrabarty as Ruchira- Parna's friend, Chayan's love interest
Shaili Bhattacharya as Barsha Dutta- Krishna and Amitesh's daughter, Srijon's sister, Ayan and Chayan's cousin sister
Arijita Mukhopadhyay as Krishna Dutta- Amitesh's wife, Srijon and Barsha's mother, Parna's mother-in-law. Mejo Bou of Dutta family.
Argha Mukherjee as Amitesh Dutta- Hemnalini's older son, Krishna's husband, Srijon and Barsha's father, Parna's father-in-law.
Manosi Sengupta as Moumita Dutta- Ayan's wife, Lalita and Akhilesh's daughter-in-law, Tinni's elder sister.
Shankar Malakar as Ayan Dutta- Lalita and Akhilesh's elder son, Moumita's husband, Chayan's elder brother.
Uday Pratap Singh as Chayan Dutta-  Lalita and Akhilesh's younger son, Ayan's younger brother, Srijon and Barsha's cousin sister
Nabanita Malakar as Tinni- Moumita's sister 
Tanusree Goswami as Lalita Dutta- Akhilesh's wife, Ayan and Chayan's mother, Moumita's mother-in-law. Boro Bou of Dutta family.
Subrata Guha Roy as Akhilesh Dutta-  Hemnalini's eldest son,Lalita's husband, Ayan and Chayan's father, Moumita's father-in-law.
Prasun Guin as Animesh Dutta-  Hemnalini's youngest son, Amitesh and Akhilesh's younger brother

References

Zee Bangla original programming
Bengali-language television programming in India
2022 Indian television series debuts
Indian drama television series